This article lists events that occurred during 1954 in Estonia.

Incumbents
First Secretary of the Communist Party of Estonia – Johannes Käbin

Events
 in Tallinn was opened.

Births
11 January – Jaak Aaviksoo, politician and physicist
6 February – Aare Laanemets, actor and theatre director (d. 2000)

Deaths
 January 8 – Eduard Wiiralt, Estonian artist (b. 1898)

References

 
1950s in Estonia
Estonia
Estonia
Years of the 20th century in Estonia